In topology and related branches of mathematics, a totally disconnected space is a topological space that has only singletons as connected subsets. In every topological space, the singletons (and, when it is considered connected, the empty set) are connected; in a totally disconnected space, these are the only connected subsets.

An important example of a totally disconnected space is the Cantor set, which is homeomorphic to the set of p-adic integers. Another example, playing a key role in algebraic number theory, is the field  of p-adic numbers.

Definition

Another closely related notion is that of a totally separated space, i.e. a space where quasicomponents are singletons. That is, a topological space 
Equivalently, for each pair of distinct points , there is a pair of disjoint open neighborhoods   of  such that .

Every totally separated space is evidently totally disconnected but the converse is false even for metric spaces. For instance, take  to be the Cantor's teepee, which is the Knaster–Kuratowski fan with the apex removed. Then  is totally disconnected but its quasicomponents are not singletons. For locally compact Hausdorff spaces the two notions (totally disconnected and totally separated) are equivalent.

Unfortunately in the literature (for instance ), totally disconnected spaces are sometimes called hereditarily disconnected, while the terminology  totally disconnected is used for totally separated spaces.

Examples
The following are examples of totally disconnected spaces:
Discrete spaces
 The rational numbers
 The irrational numbers
 The p-adic numbers; more generally, all profinite groups are totally disconnected.
 The Cantor set and the Cantor space
 The Baire space
 The Sorgenfrey line
 Every Hausdorff space of small inductive dimension 0 is totally disconnected
 The Erdős space ℓ2 is a totally disconnected Hausdorff space that does not have small inductive dimension 0.
 Extremally disconnected Hausdorff spaces
 Stone spaces
 The Knaster–Kuratowski fan provides an example of a connected space, such that the removal of a single point produces a totally disconnected space.

Properties
Subspaces, products, and coproducts of totally disconnected spaces are totally disconnected.
Totally disconnected spaces are T1 spaces, since singletons are closed. 
Continuous images of totally disconnected spaces are not necessarily totally disconnected, in fact, every compact metric space is a continuous image of the Cantor set.
A locally compact Hausdorff space has small inductive dimension 0 if and only if it is totally disconnected.
Every totally disconnected compact metric space is homeomorphic to a subset of a countable product of discrete spaces.
It is in general not true that every open set in a totally disconnected space is also closed.
It is in general not true that the closure of every open set in a totally disconnected space is open, i.e. not every totally disconnected Hausdorff space is extremally disconnected.

Constructing a totally disconnected quotient space of any given space
Let  be an arbitrary topological space. Let  if and only if  (where  denotes the largest connected subset containing ). Endow  with the quotient topology, i.e. the finest topology making the map  continuous. With a little bit of effort we can see that  is totally disconnected. 

See also 
 Extremally disconnected space
 Totally disconnected group

References

  (reprint of the 1970 original)

General topology
Properties of topological spaces